Rachel Catherine Roberts (born July 16, 1973) is an American politician and businesswoman serving as a member of the Kentucky House of Representatives the first woman ever to hold the 67th district seat. Roberts assumed office on March 3, 2020. In 2023, she became the Kentucky House Minority Whip, the fifth woman elected to House leadership in Kentucky history.

Early life and education 
Roberts is a native of Cincinnati and moved to Colorado after graduating from high school. She earned a Bachelor of Arts degree in marketing and business from Fort Lewis College and completed programs at the Harvard Kennedy School and Yale University.

Career 
From 2004 to 2005, Roberts worked as a writer and photographer for a travel blog. From 2005 to 2007, she worked in marketing for the Aspen Skiing Company. Roberts then worked as a director at Timbers Resorts. In 2010, she founded the Yoga Bar. She also founded Bija Yoga School and operates a strategy firm. Roberts was elected to the Kentucky House of Representatives in a March 2020 special election.

References 

1973 births
Living people
People from Newport, Kentucky
Democratic Party members of the Kentucky House of Representatives
Fort Lewis College alumni
Women state legislators in Kentucky
People from Cincinnati